Stelpe Parish is an administrative unit of Bauska Municipality in the Semigallia region of Latvia. Prior to 2009, it was part of the former Bauska District.

Towns, villages and settlements of Stelpe parish 

Parishes of Latvia
Bauska Municipality
Semigallia